Scientific integrity deals with "best practices" or rules of professional practice of researchers. It stems from an OECD report of 2007, and is set in the context of the replication crisis and the fight against scientific misconduct.

Initiatives 
In 2007 the OECD published a report on best practices for promoting scientific integrity and preventing misconduct in science (Global Science Forum).

Main international texts in this field:
 European Charter for Researchers (2005)
 the Singapore statement on research integrity (2010)
 European Code of Conduct for Research Integrity of All European Academies (ALLEA) and the European Science Foundation (ESF) (2011 revised in 2017).

In Europe 
The European Code of Conduct for Research Integrity, published in 2011 and revised in 2017, develops the concept of scientific integrity along four main lines :
 Reliability: concerns the quality and reproducibility of research.
 Honesty: concerns the transparency and objectivity of research.
 Respect: for the human, cultural and ecological environment of research.
 Accountability: concerns the implications of publishing the research.

See also
Academic integrity

References

Scientific method
Ethics and statistics
Metascience